Menomonie Municipal Airport  is a city owned public use airport located three miles east of the central business district of Menomonie, a city in Dunn County, Wisconsin, United States. It is included in the Federal Aviation Administration (FAA) National Plan of Integrated Airport Systems for 2021–2025, in which it is categorized as a local general aviation facility.

Facilities and aircraft 
Menomonie Municipal Airport covers an area of 277 acres (112 ha) at an elevation of 895 feet (273 m) above mean sea level. It has two runways: designated 9/27 with a 5,074 x 75 ft (1,547 x 23 m) asphalt surface and 18/36 with a 3,470 x 75 ft (1,058 x 23 m) asphalt surface. 

For the 12-month period ending July 22, 2020, the airport had 13,550 aircraft operations, an average of 37 per day: 99% general aviation and less than 1% air taxi. In December 2022, there were 30 aircraft based at this airport: 27 single-engine, 2 multi-engine and 1 glider.

See also 
 List of airports in Wisconsin

References

External links 
 

Airports in Wisconsin
Buildings and structures in Dunn County, Wisconsin
Airports in Dunn County, Wisconsin